Valvata lewisi, common name the fringed valvata, is a species of small freshwater snail with a gill and an operculum, an aquatic gastropod mollusk in the family Valvatidae, the valve snails.

Distribution 
This species lives in North America.

References

External links 
 NatureServe info

Valvatidae
Gastropods described in 1868